Temple of Ra Accursed by Set is an adventure for fantasy role-playing games published by Judges Guild in 1979.

Plot summary
Temple of Ra Accursed by Set is a scenario for high-level characters set in an abandoned Egyption-style temple that has been desecrated by evil forces.  The adventure is specifically designed for use with miniatures.  The book includes new monsters.

In Temple of Ra, Accursed by Set, the player characters travel through a magically-built temple of the god Ra, searching for the Princess Rukmini of Hindustan, who was spirited there by Set.  Some of the encounters are with Set's guardians (including the Gorgriffspidrascorp).  Other are with Hindustani creatures who are also searching for the princess.

Publication history
Temple of Ra Accursed by Set was written by Thomas McCloud and Edward McCloud, and was published by Judges Guild in 1979 as a 16-page book.

Reception
Elisabeth Barrington reviewed the adventure in The Space Gamer No. 28. She states that "Temple of Ra is well-organized and fairly complete.  The rooms are all described in almost minute detail.  Less experienced DMs will have little to worry about except playing the game.  Almost all possible contingencies have been planned for." She continued, "Drawbacks include the scale of the map, high levels of the monsters compared to the characters, and extra materials needed for play.  The scale (on graph) is one meter per square.  This may work for some DMs, but is very awkward for most.  the levels of the monsters (10th-level guards, and three Type V Demons) seem a bit high for the suggested second-level characters to handle.  And to fully understand the intricacies of the creatures in the temple, the DM needs 3 to 5 of the AD&D supplements." Barrington concluded her review by stating, "For the skilled DM, the Temple of Ra is a decent dungeon.  However, the problems listed above and the fact that there is little room left for the DM's imagination make it less than amusing to play."

Patrick Amory reviewed XXX for Different Worlds magazine and stated that "Although the basic idea is interesting (a good temple of Ra, cursed by the evil god Set), it wasn't applied very well. The author, working with his son, developed a method of building the dungeon out of Brix Blox; otherwise it makes for some difficult mapping."

Lawrence Schick in his book Heroic Worlds calls the adventure "Terrible" and notes that one of the new monsters in the book is "the beloved gorgriffspidrascorp".

References

Judges Guild fantasy role-playing game adventures
Role-playing game supplements introduced in 1979